Bat coronavirus RpYN06 is a SARS-like betacoronavirus that infects the horseshoe bat Rhinolophus pusillus, it is a close relative of SARS-CoV-2 with a 94.48% sequence identity.

Phylogenetics

References 

Bat virome
Coronaviridae
Infraspecific virus taxa